Clara Guerra (born 1 October 1998) is an Italian lightweight rower who won medals at senior level at the World Rowing Championships and European Rowing Championships.

Biography
Guerra started the activity in 2010, having her senior debut in 2017. In addition to the two international medals won at a senior level, at the youth level she won six more medals, always between World and European championships (including a Junior World Record in 2016, Rotterdam. JW1x, Final time: 7:34.47).

Achievements

See also
 Italy at the 2018 European Championships

References

External links
 

1998 births
Living people
Italian female rowers
World Rowing Championships medalists for Italy
Rowers of Fiamme Gialle
Sportspeople from Verona